Sydney Carter (1915–2004) was an English poet, songwriter and folk musician

Sydney, Sidney, Sydnee or Syd Carter may also refer to:

 Sydney Carter (basketball) (born 1990), college and WNBA basketball player
 Syd Carter (1916–1978), English footballer
 Sidney Carter (1878–1943), pseudonym of composer, occasional lyricist, and music publisher Charles N. Daniels
 Sydnee Carter, a finalist in The X Factor (Australia season 6)